The MIT General Circulation Model (MITgcm) is a numerical computer code that solves the equations of motion governing the ocean or Earth's atmosphere using the finite volume method. It was developed at the Massachusetts Institute of Technology and was one of the first non-hydrostatic models of the ocean. It has an automatically generated adjoint that allows the model to be used for data assimilation. The MITgcm is written in the programming language Fortran.

History

See also 
 Physical oceanography
 Global climate model

References

External links 
 The MITgcm home page
 Department of Earth, Atmospheric and Planetary Science at MIT
 The ECCO2 consortium

 

Physical oceanography
Numerical climate and weather models